LRM may refer to:

 Land Reform Museum, a museum in Taipei, Taiwan
 , a French centrist political party
 La Romana International Airport (IATA code), in the Dominican Republic
 Learning relationship management, a family of learning management software
 Left-to-right mark, a Unicode bidirectional formatting character
 LR&M Constructions, an Australian civil engineering and construction company
 IFLA Library Reference Model, a conceptual entity–relationship model